The Sevierville Masonic Lodge was a historic building in Sevierville, Tennessee.  Constructed in 1893, it was used as a meeting hall for a local Masonic lodge.  During 1928–1968, the Sevierville Public Library occupied the first floor, at no charge.  The Masons moved out and the building was sold at auction in 1973 to a bank which made renovations.

It was listed on the National Register of Historic Places in 1980. The building was demolished in 2006 for a parking lot, and was removed from the National Register in 2022

References

Clubhouses on the National Register of Historic Places in Tennessee
Buildings and structures in Sevier County, Tennessee
Former Masonic buildings in Tennessee
Masonic buildings completed in 1893
Sevierville, Tennessee
National Register of Historic Places in Sevier County, Tennessee